The North York River is a river in the municipality of Dysart et al, Haliburton County in Central Ontario, Canada. It is in the southern extension of Algonquin Provincial Park, is in the Saint Lawrence River drainage basin, and is a left tributary of the York River.

The river originates at Little Branch Lake in geographic Clyde Township. It flows southeast, south and west to Billings Lake in geographic Bruton Township. The river then heads south and reaches the York River just upstream of Branch Lake. The York River flows via the Madawaska River and Ottawa River to the Saint Lawrence River.

See also
List of Ontario rivers

References

Sources

Rivers of Haliburton County